Alexander Alexandrovich Galchenyuk (born February 12, 1994) is an American professional ice hockey center who is currently playing for the  Colorado Avalanche of the National Hockey League (NHL). He has previously played in the NHL for the Montreal Canadiens, Arizona Coyotes, Pittsburgh Penguins, Minnesota Wild, Ottawa Senators and the Toronto Maple Leafs. He was traded by the Senators to the Carolina Hurricanes, although never played for them, being immediately traded to the Toronto Maple Leafs. After two years playing in the Ontario Hockey League (OHL) with the Sarnia Sting, he was drafted third overall by the Canadiens in the 2012 NHL Entry Draft.

Galchenyuk is of Belarusian descent, but was born in the United States and has represented the United States internationally, and spent most of his youth in Russia.

Playing career

Minor and junior
Galchenyuk played his final year of minor hockey with the U16 Chicago Young Americans and quickly became a star player, tallying 44 goals and 43 assists, leading coach Bruno Bragagnolo to refer to winning a lottery ticket as "the odds of having another kid like Alex play for you". His performance led to him being drafted number one in the 2010 OHL Priority Selection Draft by the Sarnia Sting.

Galchenyuk was also selected 25th overall in the 2011 KHL Junior Draft by Atlant Moscow Oblast, which caused his father, Alexander Galchenyuk, to express his displeasure in Alex not being drafted in the first round by the KHL's Belarusian team, Dinamo Minsk.

In his first season with the Sting, Galchenyuk recorded 31 goals and 52 assists for 83 total points, which led to him being selected to the OHL 1st All-Rookie team alongside teammate Nail Yakupov. The following year, he missed all but two regular-season games and six playoff games with a knee injury. He was selected third in the 2012 NHL Entry Draft by the Montreal Canadiens.

On July 23, 2012, Galchenyuk signed a three-year, entry-level contract with the Canadiens. During the 2012–13 NHL lockout, he played for Sarnia in the OHL, where he served as captain of the team during his final season for the Sting and where he dominated by recording 27 goals and 34 assists in 33 games.

Professional

Montreal Canadiens
Galchenyuk made the Canadiens roster for the 2012–13 season opener, a 2–1 loss to the Toronto Maple Leafs on January 19, 2013. He was the youngest player to play a full season with the Canadiens since 1984. He scored his first NHL goal on January 22, 2013, against Scott Clemmensen of the Florida Panthers, tipping-in a shot from Brandon Prust; rookie teammate Brendan Gallagher also recorded his first NHL point, an assist. Galchenyuk finished the season playing in all 48 games with 9 goals, 18 assists for 27 points and a plus-minus rating of +14, playing primarily on the left wing of the third line. He finished in the top ten in all three offensive categories among rookies, and was sixth overall in rookie points scoring, helping propel a resurgent Canadiens team to the second-best record in the Eastern Conference.

During the 2013–14 season, Galchenyuk missed six weeks due to a broken hand. He'd finish the season with 13 goals and 31 points in 65 games.

Galchenyuk scored his first career hat-trick on December 16, 2014, against the Carolina Hurricanes. The 2014–15 season also marked Galchenyuk's first 20-goal campaign, as he tallied that amount in 80 games.

On July 30, 2015, Galchenyuk (as a restricted free agent) signed a two-year, $5.6 million contract extension with the Canadiens. The following season, Galchenyuk tied captain Max Pacioretty with 30 goals to lead the team. Galchenyuk finished second in team scoring (behind Pacioretty) with 56 points.

On July 5, 2017, Galchenyuk signed a three-year, $14.7 million contract extension with the Canadiens. In the following 2017–18 campaign, Galchenyuk produced 51 points in his sixth season with the Canadiens.

Arizona Coyotes
On June 15, 2018, Galchenyuk was traded by the Canadiens to the Arizona Coyotes in exchange for Max Domi.

In his first season as a member of the Coyotes, Galchenyuk played in 72 games, with 19 goals and 22 assists.

Pittsburgh Penguins

On June 29, 2019, Galchenyuk was traded to the Pittsburgh Penguins along with Pierre-Olivier Joseph in exchange for Phil Kessel, Dane Birks, and a fourth-round pick in 2021. He suffered a lower-body injury early in the 2019–20 season and was placed on injured reserve on October 9, 2019. Galchenyuk returned to make 45 appearances with the Penguins, struggling to match his previous career offensive output in recording 5 goals and 17 points.

Minnesota Wild
On February 10, 2020, Galchenyuk, prospect Calen Addison, and Pittsburgh's first round pick in the 2020 NHL Entry Draft were traded to the Minnesota Wild in exchange for Jason Zucker.

Ottawa Senators
On October 28, 2020, Galchenyuk signed as a free agent to join his fifth NHL club in the Ottawa Senators on a one-year, $1.05 million contract. Galchenyuk began the pandemic delayed 2020–21 season, on the Senators roster as a healthy scratch. Drawing into the lineup, Galchenyuk scored on his debut with the Senators in a 4–3 overtime defeat to the Winnipeg Jets on January 19, 2021. He was scoreless in his following 7 games, featuring in just 8 of the Senators opening 15 games.

Toronto Maple Leafs
On February 13, 2021, Galchenyuk, along with Cédric Paquette, were traded by the Senators to the Carolina Hurricanes in exchange for Ryan Dzingel. On the following day, Galchenyuk was placed on waivers by the Hurricanes and upon clearing was assigned for the first time in his career to the AHL joining affiliate, the Chicago Wolves, on February 15, 2021. That same day, before he could join the Wolves, Galchenyuk was traded by the Hurricanes to the Toronto Maple Leafs in exchange for Yegor Korshkov and David Warsofsky.

The Galchenyuk acquisition was initially seen as an insignificant depth move, and after the trade he originally played for the team's AHL affiliate, the Toronto Marlies. After putting up 8 points in 6 games, Galchenyuk was called up to the Maple Leafs, eventually making his debut on March 19 on a line alongside William Nylander and John Tavares. He would spend the rest of the season in the NHL, impressing fans and team staff to the extent that Maple Leafs general manager Kyle Dubas admitted to reporters that Galchenyuk's surprisingly success led the Maple Leafs to adjust their plans for the season's trade deadline. He would finish the season with 12 points in 26 games played with the Maple Leafs, helping the team win their division. In the playoffs, Galchenyuk would record four points in six games, but the Leafs were ultimately defeated in the first round by Galchenyuk's former team, the Montreal Canadiens.

Return to Arizona
On September 21, 2021, Galchenyuk was signed to a professional tryout contract with the Coyotes, making his return to Arizona after being traded by the franchise in the 2019 off-season. On October 5, Galchenyuk was signed to a one-year, $750,000 contract with the Coyotes. In the  season, Galchenyuk played in a top-nine forward role for the rebuilding Coyotes, registering 6 goals and 15 assists to finish seventh amongst forward scoring with 21 points through 60 regular season games.

Colorado Avalanche
As a free agent at the conclusion of his contract with the Coyotes, Galchenyuk remained un-signed over the summer and for the second consecutive year accepted a professional tryout invitation to join the Stanley Cup winning, Colorado Avalanche training camp on September 20, 2022. Galchenyuk remained with the Avalanche through training camp before he was injured in his debut pre-season game, resulting in his release from his tryout on September 29. 

In recovering from his injury and remaining within the Avalanche organization, Galchenyuk was signed to a AHL contract to begin his 2022–23 season with affiliate, the Colorado Eagles, on November 10, 2022. In recording 7 points through 7 games with the Eagles, Galchenyuk was then signed to a one-year, two-way $750,000 contract with the Avalanche for the remainder of the season on November 28, 2022. In joining the Avalanche, Galchenyuk made his debut on the road the following day in a 5-0 shutout defeat to the Winnipeg Jets. After going scoreless through four games with the Avalanche, Galchenyuk was placed on waivers and returned to the Eagles upon clearing on December 6, 2022.

Personal life
Galchenyuk was born in Milwaukee, Wisconsin, to former Soviet and Belarusian hockey player Alexander Galchenyuk and a Belarusian mother. He has an older sister, Anna. Galchenyuk's father was a member of the International Hockey League (IHL)'s Milwaukee Admirals at the time of his birth. The family moved to Europe when Galchenyuk was four, following his father's hockey career in Germany, Italy and Russia. They eventually settled in Russia, where the younger Galchenyuk began his hockey career before moving back to North America when he was 15, first to Chicago, Illinois, and then to Sarnia, Ontario, where Alex Galchenyuk, Sr. coaches.

Galchenyuk serves as the Chairman of Galchenyuk Business Enterprises, GBE, as well as the Galchenyuk Agency.

Galchenyuk is an active philanthropist, receiving a Medal of Honor of the National Assembly by the Quebec Government for his efforts in 2015.

Galchenyuk is fluent in Russian, Italian and English.

In 2016 Galchenyuk's then girlfriend, Chanel Leszczynski, was arrested for assault following a domestic dispute at his apartment. Galchenyuk and teammate Devante Smith-Pelly were questioned by Montreal police. Galchenyuk declined to press charges.

Career statistics

Regular season and playoffs

International

Awards and honors

References

External links
 

1994 births
American men's ice hockey centers
American people of Russian descent
American people of Belarusian descent
Arizona Coyotes players
Colorado Avalanche players
Colorado Eagles players
Ice hockey players from Wisconsin
Living people
Minnesota Wild players
Montreal Canadiens draft picks
Montreal Canadiens players
National Hockey League first-round draft picks
Ottawa Senators players
Pittsburgh Penguins players
Sarnia Sting players
Sportspeople from Milwaukee
Toronto Maple Leafs players
Toronto Marlies players
American expatriates in Russia
American expatriate ice hockey players in Canada